A by-election was held for the Kedah State Assembly seat of Sungai Limau on 4 November 2013 with nomination day on 23 October 2013. The seat was vacated after the death of the incumbent five-term assemblyman and former Menteri Besar of Kedah, Azizan Abdul Razak on 26 September 2013 from heart complications. Tan Sri Azizan was an assemblyman from the Pan-Malaysian Islamic Party and the first PAS Menteri Besar of Kedah.

On 21 October, Barisan Nasional made announcement that Dr Ahmad Sohaimi Lazim, lecturer in Sultan Idris University of Education has been named as BN candidate  while PAS named Jerai PAS Youth chief Mohd Azam Samad as PAS candidate.  The election was seen as a sort of referendum on current BN Menteri Besar of Kedah, Mukhriz Mahathir who failed in his bid to be elected as UMNO vice-president in the UMNO polls on 19 October 2013.

The by election was won by Mohd Azam Samad with a reduced majority of 1,084 votes.

Results

References 

Politics of Kedah
2013 elections in Malaysia
2013 Sungai Limau by-election
Elections in Kedah